Lunette Peak is located on the border of Alberta and British Columbia on the SE side of Mount Assiniboine along the Continental Divide. It was named in 1913 by the Interprovincial Boundary Survey.

See also
 List of peaks on the British Columbia–Alberta border

References

Three-thousanders of Alberta
Three-thousanders of British Columbia
Mountains of Banff National Park
Canadian Rockies
Mount Assiniboine Provincial Park